Lagenipora is a genus of bryozoans belonging to the family Celleporidae.

The genus has almost cosmopolitan distribution.

Species:

Lagenipora americana 
Lagenipora ampullacea 
Lagenipora aragoi 
Lagenipora brevicollis 
Lagenipora chedopadiensis 
Lagenipora crenulata 
Lagenipora daishakaensis 
Lagenipora echinacea 
Lagenipora ferocissima 
Lagenipora gigantea 
Lagenipora laevissima 
Lagenipora lepralioides 
Lagenipora minuscula 
Lagenipora perforata 
Lagenipora pinnacula 
Lagenipora polita 
Lagenipora rugosa 
Lagenipora sciutoi 
Lagenipora soldanii 
Lagenipora spinifera 
Lagenipora tuba 
Lagenipora tubulosa 
Lagenipora urceolaris 
Lagenipora ventricosa

References

Bryozoan genera